In the Skin may refer to:

 In the Skin (album), 1997 album by 36 Crazyfists
 In the Skin (EP), 1993 EP by Psychopomps